Emilio Morote Esquivel (Badajoz, 1966) is a Spanish writer from Ciudad Real.

Books
Náufragos (2002)
Lágrimas privadas (2005)
Cuentos nocturnos (2007)
El sendero eterno (2007)
 Los mejores años de nuestras vidas (2008)
 El reino de los cielos (2013)
 Rumores de perfección (2014)
 Negrata con tres patas'' (2020)

References

External links
Emilio Morote Esquivel

People from Badajoz
Spanish male writers